Members of the 8th National Assembly, elected on 3 June 2018.

Nationwide MPs 

 MP - MPs in the 7th NA
 (MP) - MP before, but not in the 7th NA
 MP* - elected MP in the 7th NA, but elected for minister/prime minister

Slovenian Democratic Party (SDS)

List of Marjan Šarec (LMŠ)

Social Democrats (SD)

Modern Centre Party (SMC)

The Left (Levica)

New Slovenia (NSi)

Party of Alenka Bratušek (SAB)

Democratic Party of Pensioners of Slovenia (DeSUS)

Slovenian National Party (SNS)

Elected MPs by electoral districts

Representatives of national minorities

Representative of Italian national minority

Representative of Hungarian national minority

Alphabetical list 

 Bah Žibert, Anja (SDS)
 Baković, Predrag (SD)
Bandelli, Marko (SAB) - elected Minister without portfolio for Development, Strategic Projects and Cohesion; membership terminated; later resigned as minister and returned to NA
 Bevk, Samo (SD)
 Breznik, Franc (SDS) - named State Secretary in the Ministry of the Interior; later resigned and returned to the NA
Brglez, Milan (SD, previously SMC) - elected MEP
 Brinovšek, Nada (SDS)
Cerar, Miro (SMC) - elected Minister of Foreign Affairs; later resigned as MP
 Cigler, Željko (Levica)
Černač, Zvonko (SDS) - elected Minister without portfolio for European Cohesion Policy
Černigoj, Andrej (NSi) - substitute MP (for Vrtovec)
Česnik, Peter Jožef (SAB) - elected Minister without portfolio for Slovenian diaspora; later resigned as MP
 Dimic, Iva (NSi)
 Divjak, Mirnik Lidija (LMŠ)
 Doblekar, Boris (SDS)
Ferenčič, Nuša (SDS) - substitute MP (for Breznik); lost mandate after Breznik returned to the NA
Ferjan, Jure (SDS) - substitute MP (for Mahnič)
Furman, Karmen (SDS)
Godec, Jelka (SDS) - named State Secretary in the Office of the Prime Minister
 Golubović, Brane (LMŠ)
 Gregorčič, Monika (SMC)
 Grims, Branko (SDS)
 Han, Matjaž (SD)
 Heferle, Tina (LMŠ)
 Horváth, Ferenc (IMNS)
 Horvat, Jožef (NSi)
 Hot, Meira (SD)
 Hršak, Ivan (DeSUS)
 Irgl, Eva (SDS)
 Ivanuša, Jani (SNS)
 Ivanuša, Lidija (SDS, previously SNS)
Janša, Janez (SDS) - elected Prime Minister
 Jelinčič Plemeniti, Zmago (SNS)
 Jeraj, Alenka (SDS)
 Jurša, Franc (DeSUS)
 Kaloh, Dejan (SDS)
 Kepa, Franci (SDS)
 Knežak, Soniboj (SD)
Kociper, Maša (SAB) - substitute MP (for Peter Jožef Česnik), Česnik later resigned as MP
 Koprivc, Marko (SD)
 Koražija, Boštjan (Levica)
 Korče, Jerca (LMŠ)
 Kordiš, Miha (Levica)
 Kovačič, Aljaž (LMŠ)
Krajčič, Darij (LMŠ) - resigned as MP
 Kramar, Franc (SAB)
 Krivec, Danijel (SDS)
 Lenart, Jože (LMŠ)
 Lenart, Jožef (SDS)
 Lep, Jurij (DeSUS)
 Lep Šimenko, Suzana (SDS)
 Lisec, Tomaž (SDS)
Logar, Anže (SDS) - elected Minister of Foreign Affairs
Mahnič, Žan (SDS) - named State Secretary in the Office of the Prime Minister
Maurovič, Nina (LMŠ) - substitute MP (for Rudi Medved), lost mandate after Medved returned to the NA
Medved, Rudi (LMŠ) - elected Minister of Public Administration; later returned to the NA
 Merjasec, Leon (SDS) - substitute MP (for Šircelj)
Mesec, Luka (Levica)
 Möderndorfer, Jani (LMŠ; previously SMC) - substitute MP (for Miro Cerar); Cerar later resigned as MP
 Muršič, Bojana (SD)
 Nemec, Matjaž (SD)
Novak, Ljudmila (NSi) - elected MEP
 Paulič, Edvard (LMŠ)
 Pavlin, Blaž (NSi)
 Pavšič, Robert (LMŠ)
 Peček, Igor (LMŠ)
 Perič, Gregor (SMC)
Počivalšek, Zdravko (SMC) - elected Minister of Economic Development and Technology; membership terminated
 Podkrajšek, Bojan (SDS)
 Pogačnik, Marko (SDS)
 Pojbič, Marijan (SDS)
 Polnar, Robert (DeSUS)
Prebil, Nik (LMŠ) - replaced Krajčič
 Prednik, Jani (SD)
 Prevc, Mihael (NSi) - substitute MP (for Tonin)
Rajh, Andrej (SAB)
 Rajić, Branislav (SMC)
 Reberšek, Aleksander (NSi)
 Rosec, Franc (SDS)
 Simonovič, Branko (DeSUS)
 Siter, Primož (Levica)
 Sluga, Janja (SMC)
 Starović, Vojko (SAB)
 Sukič, Nataša (Levica)
Šarec, Marjan (LMŠ) - elected Prime Minister; later returned to the NA
Šircelj, Andrej (SDS) - elected Minister of Finance
 Šiško, Dušan (SNS)
Škrinjar, Mojca (SDS) - substitute MP (for Logar)
Šušmelj, Andrej (SAB) - substitute MP (for Marko Bandelli); lost mandate after Bandelli returned to the NA
Šuštar, Tadeja (NSi) - replaced Novak
 Tanko, Jože (SDS)
 Tašner Vatovec, Matej (Levica)
 Tomić, Violeta (Levica)
Tonin, Matej (NSi) - elected Minister of Defence
 Trček, Franc (SD; previously Levica)
 Udovč, Mateja (SMC)
Urh, Karla (LMŠ) - substitute MP (for Marjan Šarec); lost mandate after Šarec returned to the NA
Verbič, Dušan (SMC) - replaced Brglez
Vrtovec, Jernej (NSi) - elected Minister of Infrastructure
 Zabret, Andreja (LMŠ)
 Zavadlav Ušaj, Elena (SDS) - substitute MP (for Černač)
Zorčič, Igor (SMC)
 Židan, Dejan (SD)
Židan, Gregor (SD; previously SMC) - substitute MP (for Zdravko Počivalšek)
 Žiža, Felice (IMNS)
Žnidar, Ljubo (SDS) - substitute MP (for Godec)
 Žnidarič, Mojca (SMC)

References 

Politics of Slovenia
Slovenian politicians
National Assembly (Slovenia)
8th National Assembly (Slovenia)